Naurskaya (Novr-Ġala) is a rural locality (a stanitsa) and the administrative center of Naursky District, the Chechen Republic, Russia. Population:

References

Notes

Sources

Rural localities in Naursky District